The Royal Corinthian Yacht Club is a watersports organisation based at Burnham-on-Crouch, Essex.

History

Early history
The club was founded at Erith, Kent in 1872 and  moved to Burnham-on-Crouch, Essex in 1892. The Club provided the crew for the Endeavour in Thomas Sopwith's America's Cup Challenge in 1934 after a strike of Sopwith's professional crew.
Five members of the club crewed the boat Lalage in the 1936 Summer Olympic Games, winning the gold medal in the 6 metre class.

Burnham-on-Crouch
In 1931 Tiny Mitchell became Commodore of the club where he was responsible for completing the new clubhouse at Burnham-on-Crouch. The Grade II* listed building was designed by Joseph Emberton and represented Britain's contribution to the International Exhibition of Modern Architecture held at the Museum of Modern Art in New York City in 1932. The building is one of the few examples of the International style of architecture in Britain.

Cowes
In 1948, the club established its southern branch at Cowes in the present clubhouse. It was operated by Rosa Lewis, a hotelier from London to provide a retreat and entertainment for gentlemen visiting the Royal Yacht Squadron. In 1988 the clubhouse was sold to commercial interests. However the buyer went into receivership in 1991. In 1993 the clubhouse was re-purchased from the receiver by a small group of members for the benefit of the club.

See also

Crouch Yacht Club
Royal Burnham Yacht Club

References

External links

 Official website of The Royal Corinthian Yacht Club at Burnham
  Official website of The Royal Corinthian Yacht Club at Cowes

Royal yacht clubs
Coastal Essex
Sports clubs in Essex
Royal Corinthian Yacht Club (Burnham)
Royal Corinthian Yacht Club (Burnham)
Yacht clubs in England
Royal Corinthian Yacht Club (Cowes)
1872 establishments in England
Burnham-on-Crouch
Cowes